The Pesedeuinge is a Tewa Pueblo ancestral site in an address-restricted area of Abiquiú, New Mexico. It was occupied from around 1350 until around 1450.

References

Pueblo great houses
Archaeological sites in New Mexico
Puebloan buildings and structures
Native American history of New Mexico
Ruins in the United States
Former populated places in New Mexico
History of Rio Arriba County, New Mexico
Tewa
Pueblos in New Mexico